Lepturges scitulus is a species of beetle in the family Cerambycidae. It was described by Tavakilian and Monné in 1989.

References

Lepturges
Beetles described in 1989